The Rauer Islands are a group of rocky coastal islands which lie between Sorsdal Glacier Tongue and Ranvik Bay, in the southeast part of Prydz Bay. Discovered and roughly charted in February 1935 by a Norwegian expedition under Captain Klarius Mikkelsen (see Caroline Mikkelsen). He named them Rauer, probably after the island lying in Oslofjorden opposite Tønsberg, Norway.

See also 
 List of antarctic and sub-antarctic islands
 

Islands of Princess Elizabeth Land